The Academy of Mary Immaculate is a Catholic girls' secondary school, situated in Fitzroy, Victoria, Australia.
It was founded by the Sisters of Mercy in 1857.

Description
The Academy is the oldest secondary girls' school in Victoria. The Academy has achieved success in sport, speech, choir, concert band, debating and many other extra-curricular activities. It is located in the inner suburbs of Melbourne and is notable for the Sisters of Mercy convent located within the school grounds. The high school's four sport houses are Sherlock, McAuley, Goold and Frayne.

Notable alumnae
 Anne Henderson – writer, deputy director of the Sydney Institute
 Alice Ross-King (1891–1968) – awarded the Florence Nightingale medal in 1949 by the International Red Cross for service in both World War I and World War II
 Mary Maguire – actress
 Abbey Lee Kershaw – supermodel
 Ged Kearney – Federal Member of Parliament for Cooper, former President ACTU

See also 
 List of schools in Victoria
 Victorian Certificate of Education

References

External links
 Academy of Mary Immaculate website

Girls' schools in Victoria (Australia)
Catholic secondary schools in Melbourne
Sisters of Mercy schools
Educational institutions established in 1857
Fitzroy, Victoria
1857 establishments in Australia